The Regional League Doboj is a fifth level league in the Bosnia and Herzegovina football league system and a fourth level league in the Republika Srpska.

Member clubs for 2014–15
FK Sloga - Dugo Polje
FK Borac - Osinja
FK Rudar - Stanari
FK Sloga - Jakeš
FK Crkvina - Crkvina
FK Ukrina - Čečava
FK Pelagićevo - Pelagićevo
FK Bratstvo - Donja Dubica
FK Sloboda - Vinska
FK Kladari Gornji - Kladari Gornji
FK Mladost - Dobrinja
FK Zvijezda - Kruškovo Polje
FK Zadrugar - Sijekovac
FK Mladost - Tišina

5
4
Bos